Hampton Park may refer to:

Australia
 Hampton Park, Victoria, a suburb in Melbourne
 Hampton Park Football Club, an Australian rules football club

Canada
 Hampton Park, Ottawa, a park and neighbourhood

New Zealand
 Hampton Park, New Zealand, a volcano in the Auckland volcanic field

England
 Hampton Park, Herefordshire, a place in Herefordshire
 Hampton Park, Southampton, a location in the United Kingdom

United States
 Hampton Park (Richmond Heights, Missouri), listed on the National Register of Historic Places (NRHP) in St. Louis County, Missouri
 Hampton Park Terrace Historic District, Charleston, South Carolina, NRHP-listed
 Hampton Park (Charleston), a municipal park located in Charleston, South Carolina